Elizabeth Dieter Torina (born October 15, 1978) is an American former collegiate softball pitcher and current head coach at LSU. Prior to 2011, Torina coached as Beth McClendon. She played college softball at Florida.

Early life and education
Born Elizabeth Dieter in Chicago Heights, Illinois, Torina grew up in Orlando, Florida and graduated from Dr. Phillips High School. Originally a walk-on and competing as Beth Dieter, Torina became the number-two pitcher on the Florida Gators softball team at the University of Florida and became the top starting pitcher as a junior in 1999. In her career, Torina made 139 appearances with 105 starts, a 60–39 record, 23 shutouts, and 716.2 innings pitched and is ranked top ten all-time in multiple categories including shutouts, appearances, wins, and starts. As a senior in 2000, Torina had a career-best 1.75 earned run average. Torina graduated in 2000 with a B.S. in health sciences and occupational therapy.

Personal life

She is married to former Houston Cougars baseball pitcher Nick Torina. They have three daughters.

Coaching career

Assistant coach (2001–2007)
From 2000 to 2010, Torina was known as Beth McClendon. Torina began her coaching career as an assistant coach for the Stetson University softball team for two seasons from 2001 to 2002, during which she helped Stetson win a shared regular season Atlantic Sun Conference title in 2001.

She then moved on to Houston from 2003 to 2007 as pitching coach. McClendon helped Houston make its first ever NCAA Tournament appearance in 2004, an at-large bid after the team finished fifth in the Conference USA regular season standings and runners-up in the C-USA tournament. Houston finished the tournament 1–2 in the Baylor regional, beating Texas A&M–Corpus Christi and losing to Seton Hall and Illinois.

In Torina's final season at Houston in 2007, Houston won both the C-USA regular season and tournament titles, both firsts in program history. Upsetting no. 23 Louisiana–Lafayette and regional host no. 7 Texas A&M before losing twice to Texas A&M, Houston went 2–2 in the College Station regional of the NCAA Tournament.

FIU (2008–2011)
Torina got her first head coaching job at Florida International University (FIU) on July 12, 2007, hired by athletic director Pete Garcia. Inheriting a 22–35 team, Torina led FIU to a 29–34 record and fourth-place finish in the Sun Belt Conference, for which she won her first Sun Belt Coach of the Year award. The following season, FIU finished 31–29, the first winning record in three years.

In 2010, FIU went 38–21 (17–7 Sun Belt) with the program's second-ever NCAA Tournament bid, an at-large bid following second-place finishes in the Sun Belt regular season and tournament. FIU went 2–2 in the Gainesville regional of the 2010 NCAA Tournament, including an upset over regional host and eventual Women's College World Series participant Florida, which was then ranked no. 4 nationally. Torina delivered another winning season in 2011 with a 31–27 record, tied for third in the Sun Belt.

LSU (2012–present)
On June 20, 2011, LSU athletic director Joe Alleva named Torina head coach of the LSU Tigers softball team.

In her first year as head coach, she led the Tigers to the quarterfinals of the 2012 Women's College World Series, followed by an SEC West Division title in 2013. Under Torina, LSU made repeat appearances in the Women's College World Series, from 2015 to 2017. Torina led the program to its first ever no. 1 national ranking in 2015 and the program's 1,000th all-time victory in 2016. Following the 2015 season, Torina earned a $45,000 raise that increased her annual salary to $225,000 and one-year contract extension through 2018. By the 2018 season, Torina had produced five NFCA All-American players at LSU.

USSSA Pride (2011–2012)
Torina was also manager of the USSSA Pride of National Pro Fastpitch from 2011 to 2012. The Pride won the NPF Championship in 2010, when Torina was an assistant coach on the staff.

Head coaching record

References

External links 
LSU Lady Tigers bio
 

1978 births
Living people
Female sports coaches
American softball coaches
Softball coaches from Florida
Florida Gators softball players
FIU Panthers softball coaches
Houston Cougars softball coaches
LSU Tigers softball coaches
Stetson Hatters softball coaches
Sportspeople from Orlando, Florida
Softball players from Illinois
Softball players from Florida